Boké is a prefecture located in the Boké Region of Guinea. The capital is Boké. The prefecture covers an area of 11,124 km.² and has a population of 449,405. It contains several economically important areas of the country, including those engaged in fishing, mining, and agriculture.

Sub-prefectures
The prefecture is divided administratively into 10 sub-prefectures:
 Boké-Centre
 Bintimodiya
 Dabiss
 Kamsar
 Kanfarandé
 Kolaboui
 Malapouyah
 Sangarédi
 Sansalé
 Tanéné

References

Prefectures of Guinea
Boké Region